Jonathan Andrew Cleveland Brown is an American Muslim scholar of Islamic studies. Since 2012, he has served as an associate professor at Georgetown University's Edmund A. Walsh School of Foreign Service. He holds the Alwaleed bin Talal Chair of Islamic Civilization at Georgetown University.

Background and education
Brown was born on August 9, 1977, in Washington, DC. He was raised as an Episcopalian and converted to Islam in 1997. Brown is Sunni and follows the Hanbali school of Islamic jurisprudence. Brown graduated magna cum laude with a Bachelor of Arts in History in 2000 from Georgetown University in Washington, D.C., studied Arabic for a year at the Center for Arabic Study Abroad at the American University of Cairo, and completed his doctorate in Islamic thought at the University of Chicago in 2006.

Career
From 2006 to 2010 he taught in the Department of Near Eastern Languages and Civilization at the University of Washington in Seattle, where he was awarded tenure.  He then gave up tenure to move to Georgetown in 2010.  After serving as an assistant professor he was tenured again in 2012 teaching Islamic Studies and Muslim-Christian Understanding in the School of Foreign Service at Georgetown University. He is also a term member of the Council on Foreign Relations.

Brown served as the director of the Prince Alwaleed Bin Talal Center for Muslim-Christian Understanding till 2019.

Publications and speeches

Brown has published work on Hadith, Islamic law, Sufism, Arabic lexical theory and Pre-Islamic poetry and is currently focused on the history of forgery and historical criticism in Islamic civilization and modern conflicts between late Sunni Traditionalism and Salafism in Islamic Thought.

Misquoting Muhammad (book)
In his book Misquoting Muhammad, Brown argues that the “depth and breadth” of the early Muslim scholars’ achievement in assessing the authenticity of sayings and texts “dwarfed” that of the fathers of the Christian church. The book received a number of positive reviews, and was named as one of the top books on religion of 2014 by The Independent. One review of the book in a Catholic journal praised the book calling it "generous to a fault when it comes to remarks about Christianity."

Writings on slavery

In a 2017 article, Brown stated that "the term ‘slavery’ is so ambiguous as to be functionally useless for the purposes of discussing extreme domination and exploitation across history," especially in the context of Islamic history. Brown wrote that the current understanding of "slavery" is defined primarily in terms of legal ownership and violations of autonomy. According to Brown, this understanding does not accurately reflect the way slavery was practiced in many times and places in the Islamic world. For example, some enslaved Ottoman officials held authority over free people, while some forms of extreme exploitation happened to legally free persons. Brown writes that while slavery's evil "is so morally clear and so widely acknowledged", and that it is the "Hitler of human practices", he also wishes to challenge the current understanding of slavery.

A lecture presenting this article, and in particular comments Brown made during the Q&A session, sparked criticism from a number of conservative commentators, some of whom accused Brown of supporting slavery and rape. In addition, some liberal scholars of Islam criticized Brown for relativizing the concepts of slavery, human autonomy, and consent, and took issue with his suggestion that Muslims cannot view all historical forms of slavery to be immoral since the Islamic prophet Muhammad had owned slaves.

In response, Brown wrote on Twitter, "Islam as a faith and I as a person condemn slavery, rape and concubinage." In a subsequent essay and interview Brown elaborated his views and apologized for having addressed the subject too cerebrally, adding that members of the alt-right had bombarded him and his family with threats of death and rape over the controversy.

Bibliography
Books authored
 Slavery and Islam, Oneworld Publications, 2019 | 416 p | 
 Misquoting Muhammad: The Challenge and Choices of Interpreting the Prophet's Legacy, Oneworld Publications, 2014 | 384 p | 
Muhammad: A Very Short Introduction, Oxford University Press, 2011 | 160 p | 
 Hadith: Muhammad's Legacy in the Medieval and Modern World, Oneworld Publications, Foundations of Islam series, 2009 | 320 p | 
 The Canonization of al-Bukhārī and Muslim: The Formation and Function of the Sunnī Ḥadīth Canon, Brill Publishers, 2007 | 434 p |

See also 
Yasir Qadhi

References

External links

 Official website of Jonathan A.C. Brown

1977 births
Living people
American Muslims
American Sunni Muslims
American non-fiction writers
Brown, Jonathan
American former Protestants
Hanbalis
Academics from Washington, D.C.
American Sunni Muslim scholars of Islam
American former Christians
Muslim scholars of Islamic studies